Gerhard Hanappi (16 February 1929 – 23 August 1980) was an Austrian football midfielder who is often regarded as one of the greatest Austrian footballers. He is also the father of Hardy Hanappi.

Club career
A versatile midfielder, Hanappi started his career at SC Wacker Wien, where he made his Bundesliga debut in 1947. Deemed as Austria's biggest football talent, he then controversially moved to play for big city rivals Rapid Vienna from 1950 till 1965. His time at Rapid proved to be very successful, winning the Austrian Championship title 7 times. He also captained the side for seven years and was chosen in Rapid's Team of the Century in 1999.

International career
He made his debut for Austria at only 19 years of age in November 1948 against Sweden and was a participant at the 1954 World Cup in Switzerland, where they reached 3rd place, and at the 1958 World Cup. He captained the national team from 1955 on.

His last international was a September 1962 match against Czechoslovakia.
He earned 93 caps, scoring 12 goals. He has held the national team appearances record until Anton Polster earned his 94th cap in June 1998.

Playing style
One of the finest midfielders of his generation, Hanappi was nominally a goalscoring wing half, however his versatility allowed him to successfully play in almost all positions. Hanappi's technical abilities and creativity allowed him to play as an effective play-maker. He was also very intelligent with an excellent sense of anticipation which made him very useful in defensive duties, and also enabled him to make well timed runs in the box. This along with his accurate shot enabled him to be a prolific goalscorer, even once being league top scorer.

Retirement and death
After his football career Hanappi worked as an architect. He planned the Weststadion in Vienna, which was renamed to Gerhard Hanappi Stadium after his death. He died of cancer in 1980, aged 51.

Honours

Club
Austrian Football Bundesliga (7):
 1951, 1952, 1954, 1956, 1957, 1960, 1964
Austrian Cup (1):
 1961
Zentropa Cup (1):
 1951

International
FIFA World Cup Third Place: 
 1954

External links
 Player profile and stats – Rapid Wien Archive

References

1929 births
1980 deaths
Footballers from Vienna
Austrian footballers
Austria international footballers
1954 FIFA World Cup players
1958 FIFA World Cup players
SK Rapid Wien players
Deaths from cancer in Austria
20th-century Austrian architects
Association football midfielders
Architects from Vienna